Coleophora arizoniella is a moth of the family Coleophoridae. It is found in the United States, including Arizona.

The wingspan is about 12 mm.

References

arizoniella
Moths described in 1907
Moths of North America